Diego Ezequiel Valanta Del Busto (born 8 September 2000) is a Panamanian football player who plays as winger for Santos Guápiles.

International career
Valanta debuted with the Panama national team in a friendly 1-0 win over Costa Rica on 10 October 2020.

References

External links
 

2000 births
Living people
Sportspeople from Panama City
Panamanian footballers
Panama international footballers
Panama youth international footballers
Association football wingers
Tauro F.C. players
Liga Panameña de Fútbol players
Panama under-20 international footballers